Sidi Slimane is a town and commune in Tissemsilt Province in northern Algeria.

References

Communes of Tissemsilt Province
Cities in Algeria
Algeria